Gayle Gordon (born 27 August 1955) is a Canadian speed skater. She competed at the 1972 Winter Olympics and the 1976 Winter Olympics.

References

1955 births
Living people
Canadian female speed skaters
Olympic speed skaters of Canada
Speed skaters at the 1972 Winter Olympics
Speed skaters at the 1976 Winter Olympics
Speed skaters from Winnipeg
20th-century Canadian women